Petri Jalava (born 14 June 1976 in Turku) is a Finnish association football central defender. He currently plays for PK-35.

He was on trial to South China in December 2006, but failed to get a contract.

Teams and clubs
Turun Palloseura
IFK Mora
Åbo IFK
Nybergsund IL
? - 2006: RoPS (Finnish second division)
December 2006:  South China AA (HK first division, trial)
2007: FC Viikingit (Finnish second division)
2008: PK-35 (Finnish second division)

References

1976 births
Living people
Footballers from Turku
Finnish footballers
Finnish expatriate footballers
Association football central defenders
Turun Palloseura footballers
Rovaniemen Palloseura players
Expatriate footballers in Hong Kong
Åbo IFK players